Skunk weed may refer to:
 Skunk (cannabis), a breed of cannabis
 Navarretia squarrosa, California stinkweed
 Polemonium viscosum, Sky pilot
 Symplocarpus foetidus, Eastern skunk cabbage
 Croton texensis, Skunk weed